Downer Rail is a business unit within the Downer Group. As well as manufacturing and maintaining railway rolling stock it holds maintenance contracts to maintain rail infrastructure. The head office is located in North Ryde.

History

The EDI Rail division was formed in March 2001 following the merger of Evans Deakin Industries and Downer Group to form Downer EDi. In July 2007 the division was renamed Downer Rail and in 2018 it merged with Downer's Infrastructure Services division to form Transport and Infrastructure.

The history of Downer Rail began in 1867 when Walkers Limited opened a branch in Maryborough. In 1980 Walkers Limited was sold to Evans Deakin Industries and included in the merger with Downer EDi.

Evans Deakin operated the former Clyde Engineering plants at Kelso and Somerton and Walkers Limited, Maryborough plant. It had recently reopened the former Cardiff Locomotive Workshops to build CityRail M sets.

In 2008 Locomotive Demand Power was established as a subsidiary to lease locomotives. In November 2009 Downer Rail became a tram operator through its 49% shareholding in Keolis Downer that operates the Yarra Trams franchise in Melbourne. In July 2014, Keolis Downer commenced operating the G:link light rail line on the Gold Coast.

In March 2015, Keolis Downer purchased bus operator Australian Transit Enterprises which operates the Hornibrook Bus Lines, Link SA, Path Transit and SouthLink operations with 930 buses.

Products
Downer Rail has manufactured items of rolling stock at its factories in Cardiff, Somerton, Maryborough and Port Augusta. As the ex-licence holder for Electro-Motive Diesel products it has also been involved in the procurement and maintenance of over 150 American built EMD SD70 series locomotives for BHP Billiton and Fortescue Metals Group's Pilbara operations.

Diesel Locomotives
GT42CU AC – 62 built at Maryborough for Pacific National and QR National
GT42CU ACe – 131 built at Maryborough for Genesee & Wyoming Australia, Locomotive Demand Power, Pacific National and QR National
GT46C – 5 built at Port Augusta and Somerton for Westrail, FreightLink and Freight Australia
GT46C ACe – 76 built at Cardiff for Genesee & Wyoming Australia, Pacific National, QR National, SCT Logistics, Southern Shorthaul Railroad and Whitehaven Coal

Electric Multiple Units
Sydney Trains M sets – 141 carriages built at Cardiff
Sydney Trains A sets – 626 carriages built at Cardiff
Sydney Trains B sets – 328 carriages originally manufactured by CRRC Changchun Railway Vehicles in China
QR Interurban Multiple Unit 160 series – 84 carriages built at Maryborough
QR Suburban Multiple Unit 260 series – 114 carriages built at Maryborough
Transperth B series – 234 carriages built at Maryborough
High Capacity Metro Trains – 455 carriages assembled by Downer at Newport Workshops. Carriage shell and other selected components are built in Changchun, China by CRRC Changchun Railway Vehicles.

Tilt Trains
QR Diesel Tilt Train – 6 power cars and 32 carriages built at Maryborough

Services

Locomotive leasing
Locomotive Demand Power is a subsidiary offering locomotives for lease. As at January 2014 thirteen standard gauge GT46s and six narrow gauge GT42s had been built at Cardiff and Maryborough respectively with nine of the former leased to Aurizon.

Light rail
49% shareholding in Keolis Downer joint venture with Keolis, trading as Yarra Trams, that has operated the Melbourne tram network since November 2009 and the G:link light rail network since July 2014.

Infrastructure projects
Northern Sydney Freight Corridor built two loops north of Gosford in 2014

Maintenance contracts
Australian Rail Track Corporation contract to maintain 2,000 kilometres of track in New South Wales and Victoria
Leigh Creek line maintenance contract until 2017
50% shareholding in a joint venture with Bombardier Transportation to maintain the A-series, B-series and Transwa Australind trains for the Public Transport Authority until June 2019
10-year contract to maintain 300 locomotives for 10 years from February 2015 for Pacific National
25-year contract to maintain B sets for Sydney Trains

References

External links
Company website

Engineering companies of Australia
Locomotive manufacturers of Australia
Rolling stock manufacturers of Australia
Vehicle manufacturing companies established in 2001
Australian companies established in 2001
Manufacturing companies based in Sydney